William John Coffee (1774–1846) was an internationally renowned English artist and sculptor who worked in porcelain, plaster, and terra cotta. He also worked in oil paint, although this was not the medium for which he became famous. His early career was as a modeller for Duesbury at the china factory on Nottingham Road in Derby, England. The latter part of his life was spent in America.

Biography

Coffee worked for William Duesbury in Derby, but he also worked at Pinxton Porcelain and potteries at Friar Gate in Derby and at the village of Church Gresley.  During his time in Derby,  Coffee made busts of some of the local dignitaries and historic figures including a life size bust of Erasmus Darwin. This bust is a fine example of Coffee's modelling skills and is now on display at Derby Museum.

Coffee also produced a terra cotta copy of the Florentine Boar (1806) and a number of terra cotta statues of Greek figures representing medicine and healing for the garden of Joseph Strutt.The Boar was moved from Strutt's garden to the Derby Arboretum, which Strutt donated to the town.  The Boar was destroyed during World War II but has been recently replaced. Coffee also made a  terra cotta statue of Asclepius, the Greek god of medicine, for William Strutt's Derbyshire Infirmary which was mounted above a dome at the very pinnacle of the newly designed hospital.

In 1816, Coffee emigrated from England to New York City, where he became famous as a sculptor for American historical figures such as James Madison and Thomas Jefferson. Coffee passed the latter part of his life in Albany, New York, where he received commissions including two plaques for the Albany City Hall, c. 1831.  He also made the ornamental plaster mouldings for Jefferson's house and for the University of Virginia. Coffee also sculpted a statue of Winfield Scott, which later served as a model for an engraving of Scott on a U.S. Postage stamp, issued in 1870.

References

External links

 Derby Museum and Art Gallery

English sculptors
English male sculptors
People from Derby
1774 births
1846 deaths